Tekin Okan Düzgün (born May 24, 1988, in Ankara, Turkey) is a Turkish national goalball player of class B1 and Paralympian.

private life
He is married to his club mate Gülşah Aktürk, a visually impaired spırtswoman and national team player. The couple has a daughter Elif Bera born 2018.

Sporting career
A member of Ankara Goalball Sports Club, Düzgün played in Turkey's national team at the 2012 Summer Paralympics, which became bronze medalist.

Achievements

References

Living people
1988 births
Sportspeople from Ankara
Male goalball players
Turkish goalball players
Paralympic goalball players of Turkey
Goalball players at the 2012 Summer Paralympics
Visually impaired category Paralympic competitors
Turkish blind people
Paralympic bronze medalists for Turkey
Medalists at the 2012 Summer Paralympics
Paralympic medalists in goalball
Paralympic athletes with a vision impairment
Goalball players at the 2020 Summer Paralympics
21st-century Turkish people